Boletus pallidoroseus is a fungus of the genus Boletus native to North America. It was described scientifically by Ernst Both in 1998.

See also
List of Boletus species
List of North American boletes

References

External links

pallidoroseus
Fungi described in 1998
Fungi of North America